Schiller was a station on the Chicago Transit Authority's North Side Main Line, which is now part of the Brown Line. The station was located at 315 W. Schiller Street in the Near North Side neighborhood of Chicago. Schiller was situated south of Sedgwick and north of Division, which closed at the same time as Schiller. Schiller opened on May 31, 1900, and closed on August 1, 1949, along with 22 other stations as part of a CTA service revision.

Ridership
In its last full year of service, 1948, Schiller served 164,006 riders, a 1.34 percent increase from the 161,830 riders of 1947. For the part of 1949 it was open, Schiller obtained a ridership of 90,157 patrons. Its 1947 performance made it the 196th-busiest station of the 222 on the Chicago "L" where ridership was recorded, whereas in 1948 it was the 185th-busiest of 223 such stations at the beginning of the year.

Notes

References

Works cited

Defunct Chicago "L" stations
Railway stations in the United States opened in 1900
Railway stations closed in 1949
1900 establishments in Illinois
1949 disestablishments in Illinois